The Marquessate of Franchimont was a lordship forming the western frontier of the Prince-Bishopric of Liège. Its base was Franchimont Castle. It was made up of the bans of Theux, Spa, Sart, Jalhay and later Verviers. The prince-bishops of Liège first took the title of marquis of Franchimont at the start of the 16th century, adding an outer wall to the castle.

Before the 1789 Liège Revolution, the Marquessate of Franchimont formed a small province within the Prince-Bishopric. This small province, six leagues long by four leagues wide, was bounded in by the Duchy of Limburg (to the east), the Duchy of Luxemburg (fragmented, to the south and the west) and the Princely Abbey of Stavelot-Malmedy (fragmented, to the south and the northwest).

The Marquessate was divided into five bans, whose capitals or burghs were:
The ban of Theux (head-ban) with Oneux, La Reid, Polleur, Jehanster and Franchimont
The ban of Verviers with Stembert, Ensival and Andrimont
The ban of Jalhay
The ban of Sart
The ban of Spa

In all, it comprised around fifty villages and hamlets.

Notes

References

External links
 www.chateau-franchimont.be
 Déclaration des Droits de l'homme et du citoyen de Franchimont

Prince-Bishopric of Liège
Theux